Baedalguk may refer to:
 Baedalguk, another name of the Gojoseon according to Hwandan Gogi; the word baedal only became popular to call the country in 1909
 Baedalguk, another name of the Shinshi which appears in the Hwandan Gogi